Into Eternity is a Canadian progressive metal band from Regina, Saskatchewan, formed in 1997 by Tim Roth, Scott Krall and Jim Austin.

History

First five albums
Into Eternity was formed in 1997 by founding members Tim Roth, Scott Krall and Jim Austin and later released an eponymous, independent album in 1999, with the addition of Chris Eisler and Chris McDougall. The band signed to Century Media Records a year later and then re-released their debut album.

In 2001, the band returned with their second album Dead or Dreaming, an album which saw a more pronounced integration of progressive and death metal. The trend continued on 2004's Buried in Oblivion and even further on 2006's The Scattering of Ashes.

Into Eternity performed on Gigantour 2006, which kicked off in Boise, Idaho on September 6, 2006. According to Soundscan, The Scattering of Ashes sold a little over 2,000 copies in the US during its first week of release. During the summer of 2007, Into Eternity (along with progressive metal band Redemption) toured in support of Dream Theater during their North American leg of the Chaos in Motion tour. Their new album entitled, The Incurable Tragedy, which is a concept album, was released on August 25, 2008 in Europe and on September 2, 2008 in North America.

The Sirens and deaths
On March 9, 2011, Into Eternity announced the addition of drummer Bryan Newbury. Also in 2011, Stu Block joined the band Iced Earth.

In February 2012, Amanda Kiernan joined the band as their new vocalist. In late 2012, Into Eternity began demoing new material with both Block and Kiernan.

On May 4, 2012, their former guitarist, Rob Doherty, died at the age of 41. On December 5, 2016, their former drummer, Adam Sagan, died from cancer at the age of 35.

In an interview in late 2013, Tim Roth confirmed that Stu Block was no longer a member and that they would continue on with Amanda Kiernan as a full-time vocalist. In May 2014, guitarist Justin Bender announced his departure from the band and that Untimely Demise guitarist Matt Cuthbertson would be his replacement. He also confirmed that Into Eternity's currently untitled sixth studio album was in the post-production stage and should see a release later in the year. On June 15, 2015, Into Eternity signed a worldwide record deal with Italian label Kolony Records. The band planned release its sixth studio album The Sirens in late 2015, but after being delayed for a few years, the album has been announced to be released on October 26, 2018. In 2021, following his departure from Iced Earth, Stu Block returned to the band to share vocal duties with Amanda Kiernan.

Musical style
The band employs a wide range of elements across the metal spectrum, including classic or melodic metal styling, thrashing riffs, neo-classical composition, power metal-style clean vocals, high to low-pitched death growls and black metal shrieking, fast tempoed death metal drumming with blast beats and sometimes interwoven with acoustic guitar playing. Into Eternity provides a sound that is considered to be rather difficult to describe, but the most common description of Into Eternity's music is progressive death metal.

Band members
Current members
 Tim Roth − guitar, clean/death growls (1997−present)
 Troy Bleich − bass, clean/death growls (2005−present)
 Stu Block − clean/death growls (2005−2013, 2021−present)
 Bryan Newbury − drums (2011−present)
 Amanda Kiernan − lead vocals (2013–present; touring member: 2012–2013)
 Matt Cuthbertson − guitar (2014−present)

Former members

Vocals
 Chris Krall − clean/death growls (2003−2004)
 Dean Sternberg − vocals (2004)

Guitars
 Chris Eisler − guitar (1999)
 Daniel Nargang − guitar, clean vocals (2001)
 Rob "Smiley" Doherty − guitar, death growls (2003−2005; died 2012)
 Collin Craig − guitar (2006)
 Justin Bender − guitar (2006−2014)

Bass
 Scott Krall − bass, backing vocals (1997−2005)

Keyboards
 Chris McDougall − keyboards (1999−2001)

Drums
 Jim Austin − drums, death growls (1997−2004, 2006)
 Adam Sagan − drums (2004−2006; died 2016)
 Steve Bolognese − drums (2006−2011)

Timeline

Discography

Studio albums

Singles

Music videos
"Spiraling into Depression" (2004)
"Severe Emotional Distress" (2006)
"Timeless Winter" (2007)
"Time Immemorial" (2008)

References

External links
 Official website
 Century Media Records
 Official Into Eternity MySpace page

Canadian melodic death metal musical groups
Canadian progressive metal musical groups
Musical groups established in 1997
Century Media Records artists
Musical groups from Regina, Saskatchewan
1997 establishments in Saskatchewan